Kyron Duke (born 12 October 1992) is a powerlifter and Paralympian track and field athlete from Wales, UK competing in category F41 throwing events. Duke has represented Wales in the 2010 Commonwealth Games in powerlifting. In 2012 he qualified for the 2012 Summer Paralympics in javelin and shot put.

History

Duke was born in Newport, south Wales in 1992, but now lives in Pontnewydd near Cwmbran. He was born with achondroplasia a form of dwarfism. His older cousin Gareth Duke also has the same condition and represented Great Britain as a swimmer in the 2004 and 2008 Olympic Games, winning gold, silver and bronze medals.

Duke took up powerlifting at the age of 12 and became junior champion at the para-sport in October 2009. He represented Wales at the 2010 Commonwealth Games in the EAD (Elite athletes with a disability) category benchpress.

In 2009, along with his powerlifting, Duke began entering para sport athletic events. He competed in both the F40 shot put and javelin at the CP Sport Grand Prix in Nottingham and the Czech Open. In 2010 as well as the Nottingham Grand Prix, Duke also entered the Berlin Open. In Berlin he finished fourth in the discus and shot put and first in the javelin, equalling his personal best of 29.53m. In 2011 Duke took gold medal in the javelin at the IWAS World Junior Championships held in Dubai, and recorded a personal best in the javelin of 33.38m at the Czech Open. 2011 also saw Duke qualified for the IPC Athletics World Championships at the men's F40 – javelin. His throw of 32.64 earned him the bronze medal.

In 2011 Duke took part in a documentary for Channel 4 in the UK, as part of the Best of British series. He, along with athlete Sean Clare, took part in the programme which attempted to challenge preconceptions associated with their stature.

Duke recorded his personal best in both shot put (11.19m) and javelin (37.39) at the Welsh Championships in Cardiff on 2 June 2012. In 2013 Duke qualified for the shot put as part of the British team for the 2013 IPC Athletics World Championships in Lyon, France. Duke took the bronze in the F41 shot.

References

External links
 

1992 births
Living people
Sportspeople from Newport, Wales
Sportspeople from Cwmbran
Welsh male shot putters
Competitors in athletics with dwarfism
Sportsmen with disabilities
British male shot putters
British powerlifters
Les Autres category Paralympic competitors
Track and field athletes with disabilities
Paralympic athletes of Great Britain
Athletes (track and field) at the 2012 Summer Paralympics
Athletes (track and field) at the 2016 Summer Paralympics
Commonwealth Games competitors for Wales
Powerlifters at the 2010 Commonwealth Games
Welsh male javelin throwers
Welsh Paralympic competitors
Athletes (track and field) at the 2020 Summer Paralympics